Critical Rescue is an American docudrama television series that is produced by New Dominion Pictures and ran on the Discovery Channel from February 2, 2003 to August 24, 2003.
The series is streaming on Tubi TV, Pluto TV and Amazon Prime Video.

Episodes

See also
 Rescue 911 - a similar television series that ran from 1989 until 1996.
 Live Rescue - a similar television series that ran from 2019 until present.
 24 Hours in A&E - a similar television series in the United Kingdom that ran from 2011 until present.

References

External links
 
 

2003 American television series debuts
2003 American television series endings
2000s American documentary television series
Television series featuring reenactments
Discovery Channel original programming
English-language television shows
Television series by New Dominion Pictures